Christopher James Uzomah (born January 14, 1993) is an American football tight end for the New York Jets of the National Football League (NFL). He played college football at Auburn and was drafted by the Cincinnati Bengals in the fifth round of the 2015 NFL Draft.

High school career
The son of Xavier and Stephanie Uzomah, C. J. attended North Gwinnett High School in Suwanee, Georgia, where he played quarterback. During his senior season, threw for 238 yards with two touchdowns, rushed for 74 yards and had 168 receiving yards with one touchdown. As a junior, he passed for 1,750 yards and 15 touchdowns, and ran for 800 yards and 10 more touchdowns.

College career
Primarily a blocking tight end at Auburn, Uzomah caught only 29 passes in his four seasons, but seven of them were for touchdowns. He majored in Marketing while at Auburn. As a freshman, he threw a 4-yard touchdown pass.

Uzomah attended the 2015 Medal of Honor Bowl along with teammates Angelo Blackson and Jermaine Whitehead, making one reception for 29 yards to help the National team defeat the American team 26–14. On January 17, 2015, it was announced that Uzomah had accepted his invitation to play in the 2014 Senior Bowl. On January 24, 2015, Uzomah caught a pass for nine yards and was a part of a South team that lost 34–13 in the Reese's Senior Bowl. Although he played in the two all-star games, Uzomah was not one of 19 tight ends who received an invitation to perform at the NFL Combine.

Professional career
On March 3, 2015, he participated at Auburn's pro day, along with Cameron Artis-Payne, Angelo Blackson, Quan Bray, Sammie Coates, Reese Dismukes, Corey Grant, Nick Marshall, Brandon King, Jermaine Whitehead, Gabe Wright, Trovon Reed, and nine other teammates. Uzomah performed all of the combine and positional drills for scouts and representatives from all 32 NFL teams. He was projected to be a sixth or seventh round draft pick or a possible priority free agent by the majority of NFL draft experts and analysts. NFLDraftScout.com ranked him the 12th best tight end prospect in the draft.

Cincinnati Bengals
The Cincinnati Bengals selected Uzomah in the fifth round (157th overall) of the 2015 NFL Draft. He was the seventh tight end selected in 2015 and the second tight end drafted by the Bengals that year, behind Rutgers' Tyler Kroft (third round, 85th overall).

2015: Rookie year
On May 15, 2015, the Cincinnati Bengals signed Uzomah to a four-year, $2.49 million contract with a signing bonus of $212,762.

Throughout training camp, he competed with Tyler Kroft, Jake Murphy, Matt Lengel, and John Peters for the job as the second tight end after Jermaine Gresham departed to the Arizona Cardinals in free agency. Head coach Marvin Lewis named Uzomah the third tight end on the Bengals' depth chart behind Tyler Eifert and Kroft.

On December 6, 2015, Uzomah made his professional regular season debut after being a healthy scratch for the first 11 games. He was promoted to the second tight end after Tyler Eifert had been ruled out of the game after suffering a neck injury. He caught a four-yard pass by Andy Dalton to mark the first reception of his career in the fourth quarter of the Bengals' 37–3 victory over the Cleveland Browns. He completed his rookie season with one reception for four receiving yards in five games and zero starts. On January 9, 2016, Uzomah appeared in his first playoff game, as the Bengals were defeated by the Pittsburgh Steelers in the AFC Wild Card Round.

2016
Uzomah entered training camp competing to remain a backup tight end against Tyler Kroft, Matt Lengel, and John Peters. He was named the Cincinnati Bengals' starting tight end to begin the regular season after Tyler Eifert was unable to return in time after fracturing his ankle in the 2016 Pro Bowl and Tyler Kroft suffered a sprain knee in training camp.

He started the Cincinnati Bengals' season-opener at the New York Jets and recorded two receptions for a season-high 59 yards in a 23–22 victory. During a Week 5 contest at the Dallas Cowboys, he made a season-high five catches for 43 yards in the Bengals' 28–14 loss. He was inactive for Weeks 11–15 after both Eifert and Kroft had returned from injury. Uzomah started the last two games of the season after Kroft had suffered a knee injury and Eifert had suffered a back injury that would require surgery. On January 1, 2017, Uzomah scored his first career touchdown on a one-yard pass from Andy Dalton during a 27–10 win over the Baltimore Ravens. He completed the  season with 25 receptions for 234 yards and a touchdown in ten games and eight starts.

2017
Uzomah competed with Tyler Kroft and rookies Mason Schreck and Cethan Carter throughout training camp for the job as the backup tight end. Head coach Marvin Lewis named Uzomah the third tight end on the Bengals' depth chart to start the regular season.

After being inactive for the first two games, Uzomah was activated for Week 3 after Tyler Eifert was unable to play due to a back injury. Eifert was placed on injured/reserve for the remainder of the season. On October 1, 2017, Uzomah made his first catch of the season for an 11-yard gain during a 31–7 victory at the Cleveland Browns. The next game, he earned his first start of the season and had one reception for 21 yards in a 20–16 win against the Buffalo Bills. He totaled 10 receptions for 92 yards and a touchdown on the season.

2018
In 2018, Uzomah played in 16 games with 15 starts, recording a career-high 43 receptions for 439 yards and three touchdowns.

2019
On March 11, 2019, Uzomah signed a three-year, $18 million contract extension with the Bengals. He started in all 16 games and recorded 27 receptions for 242 receiving yards and two touchdowns.

2020
In the Bengals second game of the season, Uzomah caught four passes for 42 yards and rookie quarterback Joe Burrow's first career passing touchdown against the Cleveland Browns.  During the game, Uzomah also tore his Achilles tendon which caused him to miss the rest of the season. The following day, he was placed on injured reserve.

2021: Super Bowl appearance
Uzomah returned to start 16 games for the Bengals in 2021, setting new career highs for receptions (49), receiving yards (493), and touchdowns (5).  He went on to catch six passes for 64 yards and a touchdown in the Wild Card Round win over the Las Vegas Raiders. Uzomah had two receptions for 11 yards in the loss to the Los Angeles Rams in Super Bowl LVI.

New York Jets
On March 17, 2022, Uzomah signed a three-year, $24 million contract with the New York Jets. He appeared in 15 games in the 2022 season. He finished with 21 receptions for 232 receiving yards and two receiving touchdowns, which both came in Week 15 against the Detroit Lions.

NFL career statistics

Regular season

Postseason

Personal life 
C.J.'s father, Xavier, earned an MBA from Auburn. Uzomah's mother, Stephanie, holds a doctorate in education. Uzomah is of Nigerian descent.

References

External links

New York Jets bio
Auburn Tigers bio

1993 births
Living people
American football tight ends
American sportspeople of Nigerian descent
Auburn Tigers football players
Cincinnati Bengals players
New York Jets players
North Gwinnett High School alumni
People from Suwanee, Georgia
Players of American football from Georgia (U.S. state)
Sportspeople from the Atlanta metropolitan area